Dane James Vilas (born 10 June 1985) is a South African cricketer. He was born in Johannesburg, Transvaal. Previously, he played for South Africa's national side and made his Test debut for South Africa against Bangladesh on 30 July 2015.

Domestic career

After four successful seasons at the Lions, Vilas moved to the Cape Cobras in search of more opportunity due to the emergence of Thami Tsolekile and Quinton de Kock at his former club.

On 27 January 2017, he signed a Kolpak deal with Lancashire, thus ruling him out of selection for South Africa.

In August 2017, he was named in Pretoria Mavericks' squad for the first season of the T20 Global League. However, in October 2017, Cricket South Africa initially postponed the tournament until November 2018, with it being cancelled soon after.

In October 2018, he was named in Jozi Stars' squad for the first edition of the Mzansi Super League T20 tournament. In September 2019, he was named in the squad for the Durban Heat team for the 2019 Mzansi Super League tournament.

Ahead of the 2019 season, he was appointed as captain of Lancashire County Cricket Club. He would lead the county to promotion from Division 2 of the 2019 County Championship.

In May 2022, in the 2022 County Championship in England, Vilas scored his 10,000th run in first-class cricket, in the Roses Match against Yorkshire.

International career

Vilas made his international debut against India in a one-off Twenty20 International. He then went with the South African team to a triangular between Bangladesh and Zimbabwe. However, Vilas appeared to be out of form, and has not been picked for the T20 side since, with South African limited-overs captain AB de Villiers the new wicket-keeper.

In July 2015, he made his Test debut against Bangladesh at Sher-e-Bangla National Cricket Stadium in Mirpur. The match was caught in a cyclone with four days washed out, and the series was drawn at 0–0. He was a late replacement for Quinton de Kock in the third Test against England on 14 January 2016, after de Kock suffered an injury before play started. Vilas arrived 45 minutes after the start of the match, after flying from Port Elizabeth to Johannesburg.

Other

Vilas appeared in the 2008 film Hansie, about the life of former South African cricket captain Hansie Cronje. He was cast as fast bowler Allan Donald by the producers, who wanted to add authenticity to on-field scenes by using real cricketers.

References

External links
 

1985 births
Living people
Cricketers from Johannesburg
Wicket-keepers
South African cricketers
South Africa Test cricketers
South Africa Twenty20 International cricketers
Gauteng cricketers
Lions cricketers
Western Province cricketers
Cape Cobras cricketers
South Western Districts cricketers
Lancashire cricketers
Dolphins cricketers
KwaZulu-Natal Inland cricketers
Jozi Stars cricketers
Durban Heat cricketers
Lahore Qalandars cricketers
Northern Superchargers cricketers